Andy Tai Chih-yuan (born 7 May 1965) is a Taiwanese comedian, actor, show host and YouTuber. He is a graduate of New York Institute of Technology.

Filmography

Films

TV drama

References

External links

1965 births
Living people
New York Institute of Technology alumni
Male actors from Taipei
21st-century Taiwanese male actors
20th-century Taiwanese male actors
Taiwanese Buddhists
Taiwanese male film actors
National Taiwan University of Arts alumni
Taiwanese male television actors
Taiwanese television presenters
Taiwanese male comedians